Lesichovo is a village in the Pazardzhik Province, Bulgaria. As of 2005 it has 982 inhabitants. The village is a centre of the Lesichovo Municipality. It hosts an annual Kukeri festival.

Villages in Pazardzhik Province